The Beatnigs were an American, San Francisco-based band, which combined hardcore punk, industrial and hip hop influences, described as "a kind of avant-garde industrial jazz poets collective".  The band was the initial collaboration of Michael Franti and Rono Tse, who would later form The Disposable Heroes of Hiphoprisy, and Kevin Carnes who would later form Broun Fellinis. The band's stage performance included the use of power tools such as a rotary saw on a metal bar to create industrial noise and pyrotechnics.  The Beatnigs released an LP  (virus065, Jan 1988) and 12" EP of their most famous song, "Television: The Drug of the Nation (virus071, remixed by Adrian Sherwood, Gary Clail, and Mark Stewart) on Alternative Tentacles in 1988.  That same year they played their NYC debut at the New Music Seminar, and recorded for the BBC's Peel Sessions.  The single was reissued by Alternative Tentacles in 2002, and the album was planned for a CD re-release while made available on iTunes and other digital retailers. One venue for the band was Barrington Hall.

Discography
 The Beatnigs (1988)
 Television (1989)

References

External links

Album review in Trouser Press

American industrial music groups
Alternative rock groups from California
Alternative Tentacles artists